Polaroid Pool Party is an EP from Norwegian artist Sondre Lerche.  The EP was available only on CD-R during Sondre's West Coast 2008 summer tour.  In lieu of traditional jewel cases and album art, it came in a plain cd sleeve with the CD-R and a Polaroid photo visible in the window.  Most of the photos were from a pool party Sondre hosted in August 2008.

Track listing 

 Weakest Spot – 6:23
 To Hell – 3:29
 It's Nothing – 5:16
 Visions to Decline – 5:27
 Heartbeat Radio (demo) – 4:07
 Lullaby Recorded in a Room Where My Sister Was Sleeping – 3:56

Credits 

All songs written, performed, produced and recorded by Sondre Lerche in New York City and Bergen, except #1 mixed by Tommy Haltbakk in Bergen, #2 drums, screams, and mix by Kato Ådland. Mastered by Lawrence Manchester.

References

2008 EPs
Sondre Lerche albums